Heath's worm lizard (Amphisbaena heathi) is a species of worm lizard in the family Amphisbaenidae. The species is endemic to South America.

Etymology
The specific name, heathi, is in honor of American malacologist Harold Heath.

Geographic range
A. heathi is found in Brazil in the Brazilian state of Rio Grande do Norte.

Diet
A. heathi feeds mainly on ants, insect larvae, and cockroach nymphs, but will also eat earthworms, leeches, and centipedes.

Reproduction
A. heathi is oviparous.

See also
List of reptiles of Brazil

References

Further reading
Gans C (1965). "On Amphisbaena heathi Schmidt and A. carvalhoi, new species, small forms from the northeast of Brazil (Amphisbaenia: Reptilia)". Proceedings of the California Academy of Sciences, Fourth Series 31 (23): 613–630.
Gans C (2005). "Checklist and Bibliography of the Amphisbaenia of the World". Bulletin of the American Museum of Natural History (289): 1–130. (Amphisbaena heathi, p. 14).
Oliveira CR, Roberto IJ, Sousa JGG, Ávila RW (2019). "On the ecology of Amphisbaena heathi (Squamata: Amphisbaenidae) from Northeastern Brazil". Herpetological Review 50 (1): 62–66.
Schmidt KP (1936). "Notes on Brazilian Amphisbaenians". Herpetologica 1 (1): 28–32. (Amphisbaena heathi, new species).
Vanzolini PE (2002). "An aid to the identification of the South American species of Amphisbaena (Squamata, Amphisbaenidae)". Papéis Avulsos de Zoologia, Museu de Zoologia da Universidade de São Paulo 42 (15): 351–362.

heathi
Reptiles described in 1936
Taxa named by Karl Patterson Schmidt